Hawks Football Club is a Gambian-based first division club with its club house in Kanifing.  They play in The Gambia Football Federation's premier division league called the first division.  Hawks is currently the only Gambian football club that has teams playing in all three divisions of the Gambian leagues.  The senior team being Hawks FC plays in the first division, the second team Red Hawks FC which serves as a feeder to the first team plays in the second division while the third team Young Hawks plays in the third division.

History
Hawks Football Club (Hawks FC) Founded in 1973 by the late Mr HOUSAINOU M.M. NJAI, has come a long way since its inception from an amateur club team to one of the oldest and leading teams presently playing in The Gambia Football Federation’s top flight.

Since its formation as a purely amateur team without any major sponsorship, the club relied on the founder and dedicated people as members of the Executive of the Club who served as sponsors giving financial and moral support to the team. Under their leadership Hawks FC has made tremendous progress over the years gaining promotion from the Second division to the first division in 1975 but relegated in 1978 only to return to the First division in 1979 where the team has stayed to this date. From that time to date, the team was crowned first division League Champions twice, second division league Champions once, won five FA Cups, the most recent being the 2016/ 2017 FA Cup final played in June 2017, one Super Cup as well as winning other trophies like the SS Ceesay Trophy, and the Papa Njie Trophy.

The history of the Hawks FC cannot be completed without mention of its founder, patron and greatest asset Mr HOUSAINOU M.M NJAI who died on the 5th of September 2002 and left a big vacuum that would be very hard to fill.  We thank God for his vision and foresight that made him found the Club.  May his soul rest in perfect peace.  We are committed to continue his legacy hence our continued efforts to keep the Club alive if not for anything for his memory and contribution to Gambian sports but particularly to football and youth development.

Over the years, Hawks FC has embarked on promoting various youth development, educational and football programmes for boys and girls respectively.  As a result of this, the club boasts of its own academy for children aged between 5 and 15, two junior teams and a Senior team.  We are currently the only team that has teams participating in all the three tiers of the Gambia Football Federation leagues i.e. 1st Division, 2nd Division and 3rd Division). The academy runs training sessions on Saturdays for the children whilst the junior and senior teams train daily from Monday to Friday at the Gambia High School football grounds, whom we have a Memorandum of Understanding for the use of their training field while we also help in the enrollment and payment of tuition for under privileged students who play for the team.  The Club also boasts of its own Club House situated at Bertil Harding Highway.

Honours
GFA League First Division: 3
 1992–93, 1995–96, 2021-22.

Gambian Cup: 4
 1982–83, 1995–96, 2005–06, 2017.

Gambian Super Cup: 1
 2017.

Performances in CAF competitions
CAF Confederation Cup
1984 – First Round

CAF Confederation Cup
2007 – First Round

CAF Confederation Cup
2016 – First Round

CAF Confederation Cup
2018 – First Round

League and cup history

National level

Staff

Club Officials

Senior Team Coach
 Alieu Jagne

U20 Coach
 Momodou Bah

Club Management

Chairman
 Hon James F.P Gomez
Treasurer
 Paschal Karbo
Media Officer
 Pa Barrow

Statistics
Best position: 1st (national)
Best position at cup competitions: Second Round (continental)

References

External links
Club profile at Soccerway
Continental tournaments of the Banjul Hawks

Football clubs in the Gambia
Banjul
1974 establishments in the Gambia